Sir Bryant Godman Irvine (25 July 1909 – 3 May 1992) was a Canadian-born British Conservative politician.

Early life
Irvine was born to William Henry and Ada Mary Irvine and raised in Toronto. He was educated at Upper Canada College in Toronto and then moved to Britain to attend St Paul's School and Magdalen College, Oxford, where he was secretary of the Oxford Union. He became a barrister, called to the bar by Inner Temple in 1932, and was a farmer. During World War II Irvine was a Lieutenant Commander in the Royal Naval Volunteer Reserve.

Political career
Irvine contested Wood Green in 1951. He was Member of Parliament for Rye from 1955 to 1983. He was secretary of the 1922 Committee 1965–66, and from 1976 to 1982 he served as a Deputy Speaker of the House of Commons under George Thomas.

In the 1986 New Year Honours, Irvine was knighted for political service.

Family
Irvine was married to Valborg Cecilie from 1945 until her death in 1990.

References
Times Guide to the House of Commons, 1966 and 1979

External links 
 

1909 births
1992 deaths
Alumni of Magdalen College, Oxford
Conservative Party (UK) MPs for English constituencies
Deputy Speakers of the British House of Commons
Knights Bachelor
People educated at St Paul's School, London
UK MPs 1955–1959
UK MPs 1959–1964
UK MPs 1964–1966
UK MPs 1966–1970
UK MPs 1970–1974
UK MPs 1974
UK MPs 1974–1979
UK MPs 1979–1983
Politicians from Toronto
Upper Canada College alumni
Royal Naval Volunteer Reserve personnel of World War II
Royal Navy officers of World War II
Canadian emigrants to England
Members of the Privy Council of the United Kingdom